The William J. Reimbold House is a historic house located at 950 White Street in Nauvoo, Illinois. The house was built in 1865-67 for William and Christian Reimbold, who were part of a wave of German immigrants who settled in Nauvoo in the 1860s and 1870s. After the Mormons and Icarians left the city, the immigrants bought up the vacated land at low prices and were largely responsible for the city's continued development. The Reimbolds were part of the city's winemaking industry, one of the most significant parts of the city economy formed by the immigrants; their stone wine cellar still stands on their property. The Reimbold House is one of two German immigrant homes, and the only one with an intact wine cellar, remaining in Nauvoo's Mormon Flat district, as the rest were destroyed during a period of Mormon restoration in the twentieth century.

The house was added to the National Register of Historic Places on December 2, 1987.

References

Houses on the National Register of Historic Places in Illinois
Houses completed in 1867
National Register of Historic Places in Hancock County, Illinois
Houses in Hancock County, Illinois